Glacier Creek is a 10 miles long stream flowing out of the Chugach Mountains, which enters the Turnagain Arm of Cook Inlet near Girdwood, Alaska.

Tributaries
Crow Creek is the largest tributary of Glacier Creek. It rises in the high mountains of the divide between this part of the Turnagain Arm drainage and Eagle River, a tributary of Knik Arm.

California Creek has cut a steep, narrow, V-shaped valley in the mountains west of Glacier Creek, which it joins  from the arm. Its bedrock comprises the same materials found on Crow Creek. The gravels are similar, also, but carry less granite and do not show in the same degree the effect of glacial action.

Winner Creek joins Glacier Creek just below the mouth of Crow Creek. Its valley, bedrock, and gravels resemble those of California Creek.

Trivia
In the TV show Gold Rush, Dave Turin operates a gold mine located at Glacier Creek.

References

Rivers of Anchorage, Alaska
Rivers of Alaska